The First Annual Jim Crockett Sr. Memorial Cup Tag Team Tournament, also referred to as Crockett Cup (1986),  was held on April 19, 1986 at the Louisiana Superdome in New Orleans, Louisiana. The first portion of the event was held in the afternoon and the second portion was held in the night. The event was co-promoted by Jim Crockett Promotions (JCP) and Universal Wrestling Federation (UWF). The tournament featured 24 tag teams. The concept of the Crockett Cup was a single elimination tag team tournament, with the storyline prize of $1,000,000.00 given to the winning team along with a large trophy. The tournament was won by The Road Warriors (Animal and Hawk), as they defeated Ron Garvin and Magnum T. A. in the finals to win the tournament.

Production

Background
In early 1986, the professional wrestling promotion Jim Crockett Promotions (JCP) announced that they were hosting a 2-show, 24-team tag team tournament with teams from various National Wrestling Alliance territories. The Jim Crockett Sr. Memorial Cup Tag Team Tournament (commonly known simply as the "Crockett Cup"), named in honor of JCP owner Jim Crockett Jr.'s father, "Big Jim" Crockett Sr. and The Crockett Foundation, a non-profit organization founded by Crockett Sr. in 1933. The first Crockett Cup was held in New Orleans, Louisiana in collaboration with Bill Watts' Universal Wrestling Federation who normally promoted shows in New Orleans. The 24 team event was split over two shows, held at the Superdome, split between one show in the afternoon and another in the evening.

Each show featured one non-tournament match beyond the Crockett Cup tournament. The afternoon show drew 3,500 people, for a box office take of approximately $40,000, while the evening show sold 13,000 tickets for a total of $180,000. The two shows were not shown as part of JCP's weekly television shows, nor broadcast on Closed-circuit television at the time. The events were recorded, since JCP would later release the 1986 Crockett Cup as a commercial VHS videotape, featuring all tournament matches edited down due to time constraints.

Storylines
The 1986 Crockett Cup shows featured a total of 25  professional wrestling matches with different wrestlers involved in pre-existing scripted feuds, plots and storylines. Wrestlers are portrayed as either heels (those that portray the "bad guys"), faces (the "good guy" characters) or tweeners (characters that is neither clearly a heel or a face) as they follow a series of tension-building events, which culminated in a wrestling match or series of matches as determined by the promotion.

Tournament participants

Event

First round
The first round of the Crockett Cup kicked off with a tag team match pitting Mark Youngblood and Wahoo McDaniel against Bobby Jaggers and Mike Miller. McDaniel hit a chop and elbow drop to Miller for the win.

Next, Nelson Royal and Sam Houston took on The Batten Twins (Bart and Brad). Houston hit a bulldog to Bart Batten for the win.

Next, Jimmy Valiant and Manny Fernandez took on Baron von Raschke and The Barbarian. Fernandez pinned Barbarian with a sunset flip for the win.

Next, Steve Williams and Terry Taylor took on Bill Dundee and Buddy Landel. Williams nailed an Oklahoma Stampede to Landel for the win.

Next, Chavo Guerrero and Hector Guerrero took on The Sheepherders (Butch and Luke). Sheepherders hit a double clothesline to Hector for the win.

Next, The Fantastics (Bobby Fulton and Tommy Rogers) took on The Fabulous Ones (Stan Lane and Steve Keirn). Fulton pinned Keirn with a roll-up after Rogers jumped out of a back suplex to Keirn.

Next, Buzz Sawyer and Rick Steiner took on Koko Ware and The Italian Stallion. Sawyer hit a powerslam to Stallion for the win.

The final first round match pitted Brett Sawyer and David Peterson against Black Bart and Jimmy Garvin. Bart delivered a leg drop to Peterson and Garvin followed with a brainbuster for the win.

Second round
The second round of the tournament kicked off with a match pitting the advancing Nelson Royal and Sam Houston against The Midnight Express (Bobby Eaton and Dennis Condrey). Royal applied an abdominal stretch on Condrey until Eaton hit a diving double axe handle to Royal behind the referee's back allowing Condrey to pin him for the win.

Next, Buzz Sawyer and Rick Steiner took on Magnum T. A. and Ron Garvin. After being double teamed by Sawyer and Steiner, Garvin tagged in T. A., who nailed a belly to belly suplex to Steiner for the win.

Next, Mark Youngblood and Wahoo McDaniel took on The Road Warriors (Animal and Hawk). Hawk hit a flying clothesline to Youngblood from the middle rope for the win.

Next, Jimmy Valiant and Manny Fernandez took on The Russians (Ivan Koloff and Nikita Koloff). Valiant had applied a sleeper hold on Ivan until Nikita hit a Russian Sickle to Valiant allowing Ivan to pin him for the win.

Steve Williams and Terry Taylor were scheduled to take on Dino Bravo and Rick Martel in the next match but Bravo had to be treated for appendicitis due to which Bravo was unable to show up and Martel was forced to forfeit the match, allowing Williams and Taylor to advance to the quarterfinal.

Next, The Rock 'n' Roll Express (Ricky Morton and Robert Gibson) took on The Sheepherders. Rock 'n' Roll Express was disqualified when Jack Victory tried to interfere in the match with the New Zealand flag but Morton hit him with the flagpole. Rock 'n' Roll Express argued with the referee over the decision and allowed Sheepherders to advance to the quarterfinal.

Next, The Fantastics took on the team of Arn Anderson and Tully Blanchard. Bobby Fulton dropkicked Anderson as Anderson tried to slam Tommy Rogers allowing Rogers to fall on top of Anderson and pin him for the win.

It was followed by the last match in the second round which pitted Giant Baba and Tiger Mask against Black Bart and Jimmy Garvin. Tiger Mask hit a diving crossbody to Bart allowing Baba to hit a big boot to Bart's chest for the win.

Quarterfinals
The quarterfinal began with The Road Warriors taking on The Midnight Express. Midnight Express utilized many dirty tactics but were unable to win which led to their manager Jim Cornette hitting Road Warrior Animal with his tennis racket, leading to Midnight Express getting disqualified and Road Warriors advancing to the semifinal.

Next, Steve Williams and Terry Taylor took on Ivan Koloff and Nikita Koloff. The match ended in a twenty minute time limit draw. Koloffs and Korstia Korchenko attacked Williams after the match.

Next, The Fantastics took on The Sheepherders. The referee got knocked out and a brawl occurred between the four teams after Jack Victory tossed a flagpole into the ring. The usage of flagpole and the brawl would lead to both teams getting disqualified and eliminated from the tournament.

It was followed by the final quarterfinal match in which Magnum T. A. and Ron Garvin took on Giant Baba and Tiger Mask. Magnum countered a diving crossbody by Mask into a belly to belly suplex for the win. The elimination of the other four teams would lead directly to the final round pitting Road Warriors against Magnum and Garvin.

Non-tournament matches
Before the finals, two non-tournament matches took place. In the first, Jim Duggan defended the Mid-South North American Heavyweight Championship against Dick Slater. Duggan countered a piledriver attempt by Slater by backdropping him but got trapped in the ropes. Slater tried to advance towards him but the referee stopped him which allowed Duggan to hit a three-point stance clothesline to Slater to retain the title.

In the following match, Ric Flair defended the NWA World Heavyweight Championship against Dusty Rhodes. The referee got knocked out which allowed Flair to take off Rhodes' protective boot and hit him with it for a near-fall. Flair tried to hit Baby Doll which led to Rhodes hitting him with the boot and getting disqualified. He proceeded to hit the referee with it as well and left with Flair's title belt.

Final
The final of the Crockett Cup took place pitting Road Warriors against Magnum T. A. and Ron Garvin. Garvin hurt his injured hand by hitting Road Warrior Hawk in the face and tended to his hand which allowed Road Warrior Animal to hit a lariat to Garvin to win the match and the Crockett Cup in the process.

Aftermath
On June 20, 2019 the tournament was added to the WWE Network as a Hidden Gem.

Results

Tournament brackets

References

1986 in professional wrestling
1986 in Louisiana
Jim Crockett Promotions shows
Professional wrestling in New Orleans
National Wrestling Alliance shows
1986